The 1971 AFC Youth Championship was held in Tokyo, Japan.

Teams
The following teams entered the tournament:

 
 
 
 
 
 
  (host)

Group stage

Group A

Group B

Group C

Group D

Quarterfinals

1 Kuwait refused to play Israel for political reasons; Israel were awarded a 2-0 victory.

Semifinals

Third place match

Final

References

External links
Results by RSSSF

AFC U-19 Championship
1971 in Japanese sport
Sports competitions in Tokyo
1971 in Asian football
AFC
International association football competitions hosted by Japan
1971 in youth association football
April 1971 sports events in Asia
May 1971 sports events in Asia
1971 in Tokyo